Feedback (2010) is the sixth solo studio album release from singer and songwriter Derek Webb. It is Webb's first worship album: an instrumental, electronic music recording, classically composed into three movements, based strictly on the structure and content of the Lord's Prayer from the Gospel of Matthew. Along with the music, Feedback encompassed additional artistic projects from photographer Jeremy Cowart, painter Scott Erickson, and filmmaker Scott Brignac.

Awards and accolades
Derek Webb was nominated for "Inspirational Album of the Year" for Feedback at the 2012 43rd GMA Dove Awards.

Track listing

Personnel

Produced and recorded by Derek Webb & Joshua Moore
All songs composed by Derek Webb & Sandra McCracken
Performed and programmed by Derek Webb,Sandra McCracken, & Joshua Moore
Recorded at Ft. Sumner Studio (Nashville, TN)The Moore House (Houston, TX)Ponzo Hondo Studios (Round Top, TX)Hyde Park Studio (Houston, TX)

Additional recording by Matt Outlaw
Mixed by Joshua Moore at The Moore House & Pozo Hondo Studios
Mastered by Bob Boyd at Ambient Digital (Houston, TX)
Art Direction by Derek Webb & Brannon McAllister
Design by Brannon McAllister
Photographs by Jeremy Cowart
Paintings by Scott Erickson

References

2010 albums
Derek Webb albums